Ashburton is a suburb of Melbourne, Victoria, Australia,  southeast of Melbourne's Central Business District, located within the City of Boroondara local government area.

Ashburton is known for the Ashburton Village shopping strip, the Ashburton Community Centre and the Ashburton Library on High Street. Nearby Warner Avenue hosts the Ashburton Pool and Recreation Centre and the Ashburton Seniors Centre. It is in close proximity to the Holmesglen Institute of TAFE, Monash University (Caulfield and Clayton campuses), Deakin University (Burwood campus) and Swinburne University (Hawthorn campus).

In 2021, Ashburton residents were found to have the longest lifespan of any residents in Victoria.

History
Ashburton is located on Wurundjeri land.

The Outer Circle Railway, originally from Oakleigh to Melbourne via Fairfield, was abbreviated to spur lines from Camberwell within a few years, northwards to Deepdene and southwards to Norwood Station by 1891. Norwood was changed to Ashburton, at the suggestion of a former local councillor, E. Dillon who had lived in Ashburton Terrace, Cork, Ireland. The area took its name from the station.

An unrealised objective of the railway line was to stimulate residential development, but at the time the locality was best known for the Ashburton Forest, overlooking Gardiners Creek, as a site for picnics. The 'Ashy Dasher', a dedicated steam train, brought day-trippers to the Forest.

In the 1920s Ashburton had a few shops, orchards and market gardens, supporting sufficient population for a primary school to be opened in 1928 (549 pupils, 2014). There was a public hall in High Street Road near Johnston Street where Catholic and Presbyterian church services were held in the late 1920s. By the end of the decade, sub-divisions on the north side of High Street began to urbanise the area. Ashburton Primary School on Fakenham Road opened in 1928.

In 1948 the railway line was extended by one station to Alamein Station to accommodation the residents of the housing built by the Victorian Government's Housing Commission. In honour of returned servicemen and women who occupied much of the new estate, the streets of the new area were named after World War II sites in the Pacific and Western Desert campaigns, and war-time aircraft and flying boats. Street names include Victory Boulevard, Benghazi Avenue, Tobruk Road, Ambon Street, Huon Court, Lancaster Street, and Liberator Street. The Solway school opened in 1950 with the name Darling East. It was renamed Solway in 1956 after the Postmaster-General's Department opened in Solway post office near Solway Street.

The rail line was electrified in 1924, and the Ashburton Post Office opened on 15 December 1927. Another office was opened at Solway (in the south-west of the suburb) and operated from 1954 until 1978.

Transport
Ashburton has two stations, Ashburton and Alamein, both located on the Alamein railway line. The 734 bus service runs down High Street.

Education
Ashburton is served by five early learning centres: Craig Centre Kindergarten, Highgate Early Childhood Centre, Clever Kids Child Care & Kindergarten, Niño Early Learning Adventures - Ashburton and Papilio Early Learning Ashburton.

There are three primary schools: St Michael's Parish School, a Catholic co-ed primary school located on High Street; Solway Primary School; and Ashburton Primary School. Solway and Ashburton are government primary schools located on Winton Road and Fakenham Road respectively.

Ashwood Secondary College, a government high school, accepts Ashburton residents.

Religious services

The suburb contains several religious institutions:

The Ashburton Baptist Church  runs the House of Hope for people seeking asylum.
 Ashburton Uniting Church provides housing for people with mild intellectual disabilities.
 Ashburton Presbyterian Church provides English conversation classes for Beginner, Intermediate and Advanced students.
 St Michaels Parish Church (Catholic)
 St. Matthews Anglican Church and the Melbourne Church of South India Church

Recreation
Ashburton hosts the following recreational interests:
Ashburton Pool and Recreation Centre (YMCA)
Solway Basketball Club and Ashy Basketball Club field teams for boys and girls from under 8s to under 23s. Competitions are held at the Waverley Basketball Stadium and they act as feeder clubs for representative basketball club Waverley Falcons.
 Auskick at Watson Park and Ferndale Park
Ashburton United Soccer Club, including Ashburton Women's Soccer Club
Ashburton United Junior Football Club (The Ashy Redbacks) Including girls teams.
Ashburton Young Cricketers (AYC) Cricket Club
Ashburton Willows Cricket Club
Ashburton Bowls Club
 Ashburton Netball Club
 Ashburton Uniting Church Tennis Club
 Ashburton Riders Club a cycling club with regular rides departing from Ashburton Station.

The Gardiners Creek Trail passes through the southern end of Ashburton. It connects to the Ashburton end of the Outer Circle Line, a bicycle and walking track that continues to Kew.

Ashburton has several community playgrounds:
 Alamein Avenue Playground
 Ashburton Park Playground (including an off-leash area for dogs)
 Ashburton Community Centre Playground
 Markham Avenue Reserve Playground
 Saxby Road Playground
 Warner Reserve Playground
 Watson Park Playground
 Winton Road Playground

The hall at Ashburton Park hosts the 1st Ashburton Scout Group.

Retirement villages
Aged care and assisted living services in Ashburton include Grand Cedar, Iris Manor, Rosewood Gardens and Samarinda. Samarinda operate the Ashy Op Shop near Ashburton Station.

Drinking establishments
Ashburton was part of the Boroondara dry area. There was no dedicated establishment serving alcohol. In 2021 the dry zone rules were repealed and in 2022 the Ashburton shopping strip received its first bar, Two Doors Brewing, a nano craft brewery and wine bar opening centrally near the Y street junction.

Electoral representation
Ashburton is part of the Federal electorate of Higgins and borders on Kooyong and Monash. The state electorate is Ashwood District.

Notable residents
 Several former Ashy Redbacks players were recruited to the Australian Football League, including: Luke Ball, Jack Viney, Toby Greene, Tom Mitchell, Eliza McNamara, Jordan De Goey, and Jasmine Fleming 
 Robert Allenby, professional golfer, grew up in Ashburton
 Edward M Dollery, army officer and administrator, died in Ashburton on 17 July 1973
 Emeritus Prof Kwong Lee Dow, former Deputy Vice-Chancellor of the University of Melbourne, attended Ashburton Primary School
 Damien Fleming, cricket commentator and former cricketer
 Nazeem Hussein, Australian comedian, attended Ashburton Primary School
 Vance Joy, singer-songwriter
 Andrew Knight, TV producer and writer of SeaChange, Rake (Australian TV series), and Jack Irish attended Ashburton Primary School
 Paul Little, businessman and philanthropist, attended Ashburton Primary School
 Garry Lyons, AFL footballer and commentator, lived in the area
 Peter Nevill, Australian cricketer, grew up in Ashburton
 Emeritus Prof. Alan Trounson, Australian embryologist with expertise in stem cell research

See also
 City of Camberwell – Ashburton was previously within this former local government area.

References

External links
Ashburton history blog
Australian Places - Ashburton
Ashburton through the Ages (2017) by Neville Lee OAM.
The Alameiners: From Mud to Palaces : Stories from the Early Residents of the Alamein Estate, Ashburton (2004) by Karyn Stamp and Gray Tham.

Suburbs of Melbourne
Suburbs of the City of Boroondara